The table below shows all results of Škoda Motorsport in the Intercontinental Rally Challenge.

Škoda Motorsport

Škoda UK

* Including 5 points that Wilks scored with Proton Satria Neo S2000 at Rally Russia.

Other major entries

* Including points scored with different cars.

IRC Victories
{|class="wikitable" style="font-size: 95%; "
! No.
! Event
! Season
! Driver
! Co-driver
|-
|  style="text-align:right; padding-right:0.5em;"| 1
|  2009 Rally Russia
| rowspan="4" style="text-align:center;"| 2009
|  Juho Hänninen
|  Mikko Markkula
|-
|  style="text-align:right; padding-right:0.5em;"| 2
|  39. Barum Czech Rally Zlín 2009
| rowspan="2"|  Jan Kopecký
| rowspan="2"|  Petr Starý
|-
|  style="text-align:right; padding-right:0.5em;"| 3
|  46. Rallye Príncipe de Asturias 2009
|-
|  style="text-align:right; padding-right:0.5em;"| 4
|  RAC MSA Rally of Scotland 2009
|  Guy Wilks
|  Phil Pugh
|-
|  style="text-align:right; padding-right:0.5em;"| 5
|  30. Rally Argentina 2010
| rowspan="7" style="text-align:center;"| 2010
|  Juho Hänninen
|  Mikko Markkula
|-
|  style="text-align:right; padding-right:0.5em;"| 6
|  34. Rally Islas Canarias - El Corte Inglés 2010
|  Jan Kopecký
|  Petr Starý
|-
|  style="text-align:right; padding-right:0.5em;"| 7
|  Rally d'Italia Sardinia 2010
|  Juho Hänninen
|  Mikko Markkula
|-
|  style="text-align:right; padding-right:0.5em;"| 8
|  46. Belgium Geko Ypres Rally 2010
| rowspan="3"|  Freddy Loix
| rowspan="3"|  Frederic Miclotte
|-
|  style="text-align:right; padding-right:0.5em;"| 9
|  51. Rali Vinho da Madeira 2010
|-
|  style="text-align:right; padding-right:0.5em;"| 10
|  40. Barum Czech Rally Zlín 2010
|-
|  style="text-align:right; padding-right:0.5em;"| 11
|  RAC MSA Rally of Scotland 2010
| rowspan="3"|  Juho Hänninen
| rowspan="3"|  Mikko Markkula
|-
|  style="text-align:right; padding-right:0.5em;"| 12
|  35. Rally Islas Canarias - El Corte Inglés 2011
|  rowspan="8" style="text-align:center;"| 2011
|-
|  style="text-align:right; padding-right:0.5em;"| 13
|  2011 Prime Yalta Rally
|-
|  style="text-align:right; padding-right:0.5em;"| 14
|  47. Belgium Geko Ypres Rally 2011
|  Freddy Loix
|  Frederic Miclotte
|-
|  style="text-align:right; padding-right:0.5em;"| 15
|  46º Sata Rallye Açores
|  Juho Hänninen
|  Mikko Markkula
|-
|  style="text-align:right; padding-right:0.5em;"| 16
|  41. Barum Czech Rally Zlín 2011
| rowspan="2"|  Jan Kopecký
| rowspan="2"|  Petr Starý
|-
|  style="text-align:right; padding-right:0.5em;"| 17
|  45. Canon Mecsek Rallye 2011
|-
|  style="text-align:right; padding-right:0.5em;"| 18
|  RACMSA Rally of Scotland 2011
| rowspan="3"|  Andreas Mikkelsen
| rowspan="3"|  Ola Fløene
|-
|  style="text-align:right; padding-right:0.5em;"| 19
|  39th FxPro Cyprus Rally
|-
|  style="text-align:right; padding-right:0.5em;"| 20
|  47º Sata Rallye Açores
| rowspan="8" style="text-align:center;"| 2012
|-
|  style="text-align:right; padding-right:0.5em;"| 21
|  36. Rally Islas Canarias Trofeo El Corte Inglés
|  Jan Kopecký
|  Petr Starý
|-
|  style="text-align:right; padding-right:0.5em;"| 22
|  Circuit of Ireland 2012
|  Juho Hänninen
|  Mikko Markkula
|-
|  style="text-align:right; padding-right:0.5em;"| 23
|  96. Rally Targa Florio 2012
|  Jan Kopecký
|  Petr Starý
|-
|  style="text-align:right; padding-right:0.5em;"| 24
|  48. Belgium Geko Ypres Rally 2012
|  Juho Hänninen
|  Mikko Markkula
|-
|  style="text-align:right; padding-right:0.5em;"| 25
|  Sibiului Rally Romania 2012
|  Andreas Mikkelsen
|  Ola Fløene
|-
|  style="text-align:right; padding-right:0.5em;"| 26
|  42. Barum Czech Rally Zlín 2012
|  Juho Hänninen
|  Mikko Markkula
|-
|  style="text-align:right; padding-right:0.5em;"| 27
|  32. Mabanol Rally Sliven 2012
|  Dimitar Iliev
|  Yanaki Yanakiev
|}

Czech auto racing teams
Motorsport IRC results
Intercontinental Rally Challenge